Lakewood, officially the Municipality of Lakewood (Subanen: Benwa Danaw; Chavacano: Municipalidad de Lakewood), is a 4th class municipality in the province of Zamboanga del Sur, Philippines. According to the 2020 census, it has a population of 21,559 people.

Etymology
The old name of Lakewood is Danaw Likowai and Tubod is Obod. Its name derives from the Cebuano term tubod which means "spring". Its current name derived from Lake Wood, a large lake on which the poblacion is located.

History
The municipality was founded on November 11, 1977, when Barangays Gatub and Bagong Kahayag of the Municipality of Kumalarang and Barangays Lakewood, Bolalawan, Sebugay, Bisuangan, Lokoan, Backing, Dagum, Sapang Pinolis, Tubod, Gasa, Tiwales and Matalang of the Municipality of Lapuyan were separated and formed into an independent municipality. The most popular species of fish in the province can only be caught in the lake: the carpa and porang.

The Subanen tribe is the major ethnic group living in the suburban areas; they cultivate vegetables and corn for their own use. Subanens have their own language, but they also speak Cebuano as a common language for conversation.

Geography

Barangays
Lakewood is politically subdivided into 14 barangays.
 Bagong Kahayag
 Baking
 Biswangan
 Bululawan
 Dagum
 Gasa
 Gatub
 Lukuan
 Matalang
 Poblacion (Lakewood proper)
 Sapang Pinoles
 Sebuguey
 Tiwales
 Tubod

Climate

Demographics

Economy

Tourism
The Alindahaw Resort near the lake located at Brangay Biswangan, Lily's Hidden Spring in the upper part of Tubod, and Mainit Waterfall in the lower part of Gatub are among Lakewood's tourist attractions.

Health
It has a hospital, the Singidas Medical Clinic, which is regarded as the cleanest hospital of the town.

References

External links
 Lakewood Profile at PhilAtlas.com
 [ Philippine Standard Geographic Code]
Philippine Census Information

Municipalities of Zamboanga del Sur
Establishments by Philippine presidential decree